Dieter Delle Karth (born 30 March 1944) is an Austrian bobsledder. He competed in the two man event at the 1976 Winter Olympics.

References

1944 births
Living people
Austrian male bobsledders
Olympic bobsledders of Austria
Bobsledders at the 1976 Winter Olympics
Sportspeople from Tyrol (state)